Big Brother Africa 4 (also known as Big Brother Africa: Revolution) was the fourth series of the Big Brother Africa reality television series produced by Endemol. The series began airing on September 6, 2009, and aired for 92 days, ending on December 6, 2009 on M-Net. Nigerian television star IK Osakioduwa was the new host for the series. The grand prize fund this year is $200,000.

Format
This year's format has changed from past seasons. Some of the changes are:
Housemates are now allowed to freely discuss nominations.
The public will vote to save, not voting to evict. However, some weeks have included the public voting to evict instead of to save.
The winner receives $200,000.
There has been numerous twists in this year's series.
On Day 0, twelve all-male housemates entered the House, with no female housemates entered.
One housemate, Edward, has a twin brother, Erastus, who are both part of the twin twist. Every few days, Edward and Erastus will switch places. Their mission is to keep secret that they have switched places. If they both successfully do this for two weeks, they will play individually. Three people are allowed to find out, but if four people find out, they will play as one housemate. They were successful, and allowed to play as individuals. Erastus became the seventh person to be evicted from the House on Day 28.
For the first time, on Day 7, two housemates, Teddy and Wayoe, became evicted as part of a double eviction.
After the double eviction, twelve all-female housemates entered a house next door, without the male housemates knowing. The female housemates spied on the male housemates for one week, before entering the main house.
For the first time, on Day 28, three housemates, Erastus, Rene, and Paloma became evicted as part of a triple eviction.
On Day 28, it was announced that all remaining housemates would no longer be competing individually, but in pairs. The pairs will play the game as one. If one member is nominated, both are nominated. If one is saved by the Head of House, both are safe. If one is evicted, then both are evicted. Although, diary sessions can be still individual. The pairs were:
Jeremy and Geraldine
Edward and Emma
Kaone and Liz
Itai and Nkenna
Hannington and Yacob
Quinn and Kristal
Mzamo and Leonel
Kevin and Elizabeth
On Day 49, the pairs were dismantled and the housemates were, again, playing as individuals.

Housemates
A total of 25 housemates entered the House, an increase than previous series. Fourteen countries; Angola, Botswana, Ethiopia, Ghana, Malawi, Mozambique, Namibia, Nigeria, Kenya, South Africa, Uganda, Tanzania, Zambia and Zimbabwe participated in this year's series. On Day 0, twelve male housemates entered the House. During week one, Edward's twin, Erastus, switched places with each other. They will switch on and off in the first two weeks. On Day 7, twelve female housemates entered a secret House next door. On Day 14, Edward and Erastus was revealed to the male housemates as twins, and from now on will play as individuals.

Edna
Edna Alfredo is a 27-year-old graduate from Angola. Edna became the third person to be evicted from the House on Day 14.

Edward
Edward Moongo is a 33-year-old Public Relations Officer from Namibia. Edward finished in third place during finale night on Day 91.

Elizabeth
Elizabeth Gupta is a 23-year-old actress from Tanzania. Elizabeth became the seventeenth housemate to be evicted from the House on Day 63.

Now engaged to former housemate at Big Brother Africa 4, Kevin Chuwang Pam. The 2 were married on 26 February 2011 in Abuja, Nigeria. On 16 August 2011, the couple welcomed daughter, Malaika Savannah Chuwang Pam

Emma
Emma da Rocha is a 24-year-old student from Angola. Emma finished as runner-up during finale night on Day 91.

Erastus
Erastus Moongo is Edward's 33-year-old twin from Namibia. He works as a business owner. Erastus became the seventh person to be evicted from the House on Day 28.

Geraldine
Geraldine Iheme is a 24-year-old student from Nigeria. Geraldine became the nineteenth housemate to be evicted from the House on Day 77.

Hannington
Hannington Kuteesa is a 23-year-old student from Uganda. Hannington, along with his partner Yacob, became the first pair, and eleventh person to be evicted from the House on Day 35.

In 2010 Hannigton competed as a contestant in Big Brother Africa: All-Stars.  He survived 61 days before being removed from the house due to his physical fight with housemate(barnmate) Leratio on Day 58.  Overall Hannington has spent 96 days total in the Big Brother House.

Itai
Itai Makumbe Born in 1978, from Zimbabwe. Itai has a Bachelor of Arts degree (Humanities & Social
Sciences), and a Masters Degree in Peace and Governance from Africa University. He became the 19th housemate to be evicted from the House on Day 84. “Star Housemates” like the late Steven Kanumba, had initially predicted Itai’s win upon meeting him in the house. Itai was nicknamed “the serpent” by fans due to his cunning ways. He proved to be very strategic, and intelligent; taking the game to a whole other level when it came to “conspiracies” in the house. He was an original. Soon after BBA, Itai moved to the United Kingdom where he currently lives and works.

Jennifer
Jennifer Mussanhane is a 22-year-old graduate from Mozambique. Jennifer voluntarily walked on Day 21.

In 2010 Jennifer competed as a contestant in Big Brother Africa: All-Stars and lasted 77 days, for a total 98 combined.

In December 2009 during a tour in Zambia with fellow former housemates, Mussanhane and South African housemate Quinn Sieber officially announced their relationship. In October 2011, the couple announced that they were expecting their first child. Mussanhane gave birth to daughter Vida Marley Sieber on 24 November 2011. They got engaged in February 2012.

Jeremy
Jeremy Ndirangu is a 28 year-old auditor with the leading security Security firm from Kenya. Jeremy became the sixteenth housemate to be evicted from the House on Day 56. Jeremy is a father to a beautiful daughter Zola. Now aspiring to become the next Finance Director for the security firm he works for.

Kaone
Kaone Ramontshonyana is a 26-year-old Principal Youth Officer from Botswana. Kaone, along with his partner Liz, became the second pair, and thirteenth housemate to be evicted from the House on Day 42.

In 2010 Kaone is competing as a contestant in Big Brother Africa: All-Stars.

Kevin
Kevin Chuwang is a 27-year-old entertainer from Nigeria. Kevin became the winner on Day 91, walking away with $200,000.

Kristal
Kristal Culverwell is a 26-year-old technician from Zimbabwe. Kristal, along with her partner Quinn, became the third pair, and fifteenth housemate to be from the House evicted on Day 49.

Leonel
Leonel Estevao is a 23-year-old IT administrator from Mozambique. Leonel Estevao became the eighteenth housemate to be evicted from the House on Day 70.

Liz
Liz Coka is a 22-year-old from South Africa. Liz, along with her partner thami, became the second pair, and twelfth housemate to be from the House evicted on Day 42.

Maggie
Maggie Mungalu is a 23-year-old student/model from Zambia. Maggie became the fourth person to be evicted from the House in a double eviction on Day 14.

Mzamo
Mzamo Chibambo is a 24-year-old PA from Malawi. Mzamo finished in fourth place during finale night on Day 91.

Nkenna
Nkenna Iwuagwu is a 23-year-old from Nigeria. Nkenna finished in fifth place during finale night on Day 91.

Paloma
Paloma Manda is a 25-year-old sales assistant from Zambia. Paloma became the ninth person to be evicted from the House on Day 28, after a triple eviction.

In 2010 Paloma competed as a contestant in Big Brother Africa: All-Stars in which she lasted 84 days in the house, for a total of 112 days for both her stays in the Big Brother house.

Phil
Filbert Okure is a 25-year-old Marketing Consultant from Uganda. Phil became the fifth person to be evicted from the House on Day 21.

Quinn
Quinn Sieber is a 21-year-old Media Diploma student from South Africa. Quinn, along with his partner Kristal, became the third pair, and fourteenth housemate to be from the House evicted on Day 49.

Rene
Rene Moolman is a 26-year-old hairstylist from Namibia. Rene became the eighth person to be evicted from the House on Day 28, after a triple eviction.

Teddy
Edward Muthusi is a 34-year-old developer from Kenya. Teddy was the first person to be evicted from the House on Day 7.

Wayoe
George Wayoe is a 34-year-old web developer from Ghana. Wayoe was the second person to be evicted from the House on Day 7, as part of a double eviction.

Yacob
Yacob Yehdego is a 28-year-old assistant manager from Ethiopia. Yacob, along with his partner Hannington, became the first pair, and tenth person to be evicted from the House on Day 35.

In 2010 Yacob participated as a contestant in Big Brother Africa: All-Stars; he lasted 50 days before he quit. Yacob has spent a total of 85 days in the Big Brother House.

Nominations table
Each week the housemates must nominate two of their fellow housemates for eviction. Each week the HoH must choose to save one of the initial evictees and replace them with another housemate. In weeks when more than two housemates are nominated for eviction the voting results to save are revealed as evict votes which go to housemates who received the fewest votes in a country or countries. Any changes that affect nominations are noted.

Nomination notes

Controversy
Many fans were not happy about the inequality of number of housemates per representing country. They were emphasizing on how some countries had three participants (e.g. Namibia, Nigeria) while other countries simply had one participant (e.g. Botswana, Malawi, Ethiopia, Ghana - whose only participant was evicted on the first week on the show). The fans complained about the issue to M-Net after how unfair the balance of the game was.

References

External links
 Big Brother Africa 4 at M-Net
 Big Brother Africa 4 on TVSA
 Big Brother Africa Official Fan Site on BigBrotherAfrica.com

2009 South African television seasons
04